Idan Baruch (born 11 January 1990 in Petah Tikva) is a former Israeli-Romanian football goalkeeper.

References

1990 births
Living people
Israeli footballers
Beitar Tel Aviv Bat Yam F.C. players
Maccabi Netanya F.C. players
CS Concordia Chiajna players
LPS HD Clinceni players
Hapoel Ramat Gan F.C. players
Hapoel Bik'at HaYarden F.C. players
Maccabi Kiryat Gat F.C. players
Liga I players
Israeli people of Romanian-Jewish descent
Israeli expatriate footballers
Expatriate footballers in Romania
Israeli expatriate sportspeople in Romania
Liga Leumit players
Israeli Premier League players
Footballers from Petah Tikva
Association football goalkeepers